Catherine Couturier is a French politician. A member of La France Insoumise, she currently serves as National Assembly deputy for Creuse's constituency.

Biography 
Couturier was born on 27 February 1959 in Guéret, in Nouvelle-Aquitaine. She completed her tertiary education in Limoges. She later worked as a technician for France Télécom S.A., and was active in the General Confederation of Labour.

She was a member of the French Communist Party until 2016, when she left to join the newly-founded left-wing party La France Insoumise, led by Jean-Luc Mélenchon. From 2001 to 2020, she served as a municipal councillor in Limay, spending several years as deputy mayor.

In the 2022 French legislative election, she was the La France Insoumise candidate for Creuse's sole constituency, as part of the New Ecological and Social People's Union (NUPES) coalition. She finished with 26,37% of the vote in the first round of the elections, qualifying for the second round. In the second round, she finished with 51,44% of the vote, defeating La République En Marche! incumbent Jean-Baptiste Moreau.

She currently sits on the Sustainable Development, Spatial and Regional Planning Committee.

References 

Living people
Members of the National Assembly (France)
Deputies of the 16th National Assembly of the French Fifth Republic
La France Insoumise politicians
People from Guéret
1959 births